Konstantinos Pangalos (born 3 July 1985) is a Greek footballer who plays as a forward.

Career
On 28 July 2019, AEEK SYNKA announced the signing of Pangalos. However, the club confirmed on 23 October 2019, that Pangalos had left the club again by mutual agreement due to professional reasons.

References

1985 births
Living people
Greek footballers
Greek expatriate footballers
Super League Greece players
Football League (Greece) players
Cypriot First Division players
Panachaiki F.C. players
Panthrakikos F.C. players
Platanias F.C. players
AEZ Zakakiou players
OFI Crete F.C. players
Iraklis Psachna F.C. players
AO Chania F.C. players
Aris Limassol FC players
Expatriate footballers in Cyprus
Greek expatriate sportspeople in Cyprus
Association football forwards
Footballers from Chania